Senegal competed at the 1988 Summer Olympics in Seoul, South Korea.  Amadou Dia Ba won the nation's first ever Olympic medal.

Medalists

Competitors
The following is the list of number of competitors in the Games.

Results by event

Athletics
Men's 4 × 400 m Relay
 Ousmane Diarra, Babacar Niang, Moussa Fall, and Amadou Dia Ba
 Heat – 3:06.93
 Semi Final – 3:07.19 (→ did not advance)

Swimming
Men's 50m Freestyle
 Bruno N'Diaye
 Heat – 25.63 (→ did not advance, 56th place)

Men's 100m Freestyle
 Mouhamed Diop
 Heat – 54.93 (→ did not advance, 59th place)

Men's 100m Backstroke
 Bruno N'Diaye
 Heat – 1:05.06 (→ did not advance, 47th place)

Men's 200m Individual Medley
 Mouhamed Diop
 Heat – 2:20.74 (→ did not advance, 52nd place)
 Bruno N'Diaye
 Heat – 2:29.18 (→ did not advance, 54th place)

References

 Senegalese Olympic Committee
Official Olympic Reports
International Olympic Committee results database

Nations at the 1988 Summer Olympics
1988
Oly